Ignác, also sometimes spelled Ignac in English, is the Czech, Slovak and Hungarian version of the name Ignatius.

Ignac is also a surname, among the most common surnames in the Međimurje County of Croatia.

Notable people with this name include:
Ignác Alpár (1855–1928), Hungarian architect
Jozef Ignác Bajza (1755–1836), Slovak writer, satirist and Catholic priest
Ignác Batthyány (1741–1798), Hungarian Roman Catholic Bishop of Transylvania
Jan Josef Ignác Brentner (1689–1742), Czech composer of baroque era
Ignác Frank (1788–1850), Hungarian jurist and private law scholar
Ignác Goldziher (1850–1921), Hungarian orientalist
Ignác Gyulay (1763–1831), Hungarian military officer
Ignác Irhás (born 1985), Hungarian football player
Jiří Ignác Linek (1725–1791), renowned Czech late-Baroque composer and pedagogue
Ignác Raab (1715–1787), Czech Jesuit and painter
Ignác Šechtl (1840–1911), pioneer of Czech photography and cinematography
Ignác Šustala (1822–1881), Czech entrepreneur, founder of the company that became Tatra
Ignác Török (1795–1849), honvéd general in the Hungarian Army

See also
 Ignaz

References

Czech masculine given names
Hungarian masculine given names